Operation Eagle Eye may refer to:

 Operation Eagle Eye (United States), a racial profiling campaign in the 1960s in Arizona
 Operation Eagle Eye (Kosovo), an unarmed aerial operation in the 1990s in the lead up to the 1999 Kosovo War

See also 
 Eagle Eye (disambiguation)
 Operation Eagle (disambiguation)